Martin Douillard (born March 20, 1985 in Les Sables-d'Olonne) is a French professional footballer who currently plays for FC Aurillac Arpajon Cantal Auvergne as a midfielder.

He has also represented Le Mans, Clermont Foot, Luçon, Mulhouse, Pau and Rodez.

References

External links
 Career history at ASF
 

1985 births
Living people
People from Les Sables-d'Olonne
French footballers
Association football midfielders
Ligue 1 players
Ligue 2 players
Le Mans FC players
Clermont Foot players
Luçon FC players
Yverdon-Sport FC players
FC Mulhouse players
Pau FC players
Rodez AF players
FC Aurillac Arpajon Cantal Auvergne players
Sportspeople from Vendée
Footballers from Pays de la Loire